Valentín Mariano José Castellanos Giménez (born 3 October 1998), also known by his nickname Taty Castellanos, is an Argentine professional footballer who plays as a forward for La Liga club Girona, on loan from Major League Soccer club New York City FC.

Club career

Early career 
Castellanos started his club career in the youth academy of Universidad de Chile. He made his senior team debut in the 2017 Copa Sudamericana against Corinthians playing 14 minutes. He then moved to Torque on a one-year loan in July 2017. While on loan, he scored two goals in 11 appearances and helped the club win the Segunda Division title and secure promotion to Uruguay's top flight. On 1 July 2018, his move from Universidad de Chile to Torque was made permanent.

New York City FC 
On 27 July 2018, he joined Major League Soccer side New York City FC on loan until the end of the 2018 season. In his first match with New York City FC, he started and scored a goal against the Vancouver Whitecaps. New York City exercised their option to buy Castellanos on 29 November 2018, ahead of the 2019 season.

In 2019, Castellanos played an integral role in New York City's attack, scoring 11 times and adding seven assists in 30 matches. This form helped NYCFC finish atop the Eastern Conference standings and qualify for their first CONCACAF Champions League. 

In 2020, Castellanos declined in his production, scoring six goals and adding three assists in 22 matches during a season shortened by the COVID-19 Pandemic. Castellanos suffered from an inability to finish chances as he had an xG/90 of 0.65, but ended the season with G/90 of only 0.40. NYCFC would finish fifth in the Eastern Conference standings. During the first round of the 2020 MLS Cup Playoffs Castellanos had his initial penalty in a shootout vs. Orlando City saved, but VAR overturned the call due to goalkeeper Pedro Gallese leaving the goal line early. He scored his second penalty but NYCFC lost 6–5 in the shootout, eliminating them from the playoffs.

Castellanos was able to finish much more consistently during the 2021 season, becoming only the fifth player in MLS history to score in each of their club's first four matches. Shortly after this milestone, on 13 May 2021, Castellanos signed a new deal with NYCFC through 2025. Castellanos again played an integral role in New York City's attack throughout the 2021 season. He significantly improved his G/90 to 0.62 and raised his xG/90 to 0.70 showing improvement in his movement, creation ability, and finishing. He was especially good near the season's conclusion, scoring 12 goals in NYCFC's last 14 matches. During this stretch, he was awarded MLS Player of the Month for August and the NYCFC Player of the Month for both August and September. He ended the season as the team's leading scorer with 19 goals and added eight assists, winning the MLS Golden Boot over DC United's Ola Kamara on the assist tiebreaker. Castellanos also led the league in shots and shots on target with 132 and 57, respectively. Castellanos scored in all three of his 2021 MLS Cup Playoff appearances, including the first goal of the 2021 MLS Cup, which NYCFC won on penalties, giving Castellanos the first domestic trophy of his career.

Girona (loan)
On 25 July 2022, Castellanos joined newly promoted La Liga club Girona on a season-long loan.

International career
In October 2019, Castellanos was called up for the first time to the Argentina national under-23 football team by coach Fernando Batista for two friendly matches against Mexico.

Career statistics

Club

Honours
Torque
 Uruguayan Segunda División: 2017

New York City FC
MLS Cup: 2021

Argentina U23
CONMEBOL Pre-Olympic Tournament: 2020

Individual
NYCFC Player of the Month:  August 2021, September 2021
MLS Player of the Month: October/November 2020, August 2021
MLS Golden Boot: 2021
MLS Best XI: 2021

References

External links
 

1998 births
Living people
Sportspeople from Mendoza, Argentina
Argentine footballers
Association football midfielders
Uruguayan Segunda División players
Uruguayan Primera División players
Major League Soccer players
La Liga players
Universidad de Chile footballers
Montevideo City Torque players
New York City FC players
Girona FC players
Argentine expatriate footballers
Argentine expatriate sportspeople in Chile
Argentine expatriate sportspeople in Uruguay
Argentine expatriate sportspeople in the United States
Argentine expatriate sportspeople in Spain
Expatriate footballers in Chile
Expatriate footballers in Uruguay
Expatriate soccer players in the United States
Expatriate footballers in Spain